John M. Perone (born June 19, 1945) is an American politician who served in the New York State Assembly from 1979 to 1984.

References

1945 births
Living people
Republican Party members of the New York State Assembly